Al Amir Mohammed Waheed Deen served as Vice President of the Maldives from April 25, 2012 to November 10, 2013. He was appointed by President Mohamed Waheed Hassan on February 15, 2012, following the disputed resignation of the previous president, Mohamed Nasheed. He is also the Chairman of Bandos Maldives. Deen is the son of Prince Abdullah Imaaduddeen and Koli Dhon Didi. He is also a member of the Maldivian Royal Family as his grandfather was Sultan Muhammad Imaaduddeen IV. He previously served as Minister of Atolls Development and Minister of Youth and Sports until August 2008 under Maumoon Abdul Gayoom. He resigned from the Vice President’s post hours before the end of the presidential term, and after the country’s last ditch attempt to elect a new president before the constitutional deadline of November 11 failed after the Supreme Court suspended the runoff which was slated for 10 November. Neither the Vice President nor the Government stated the cause of the resignation.

References 

Year of birth missing (living people)
Living people
Vice presidents of the Maldives
Maldivian politicians
Government ministers of the Maldives